Carbost is a crofting settlement at the southern end of the Trotternish peninsula on the Isle of Skye in the  Highlands of Scotland. It is a few miles north west of the village of Portree and is in the council area of Highland.

References

Populated places in the Isle of Skye